Ray Card (born  4 April 1957) is a former Australian rules footballer in the Victorian Football League for Geelong Football Club. He wore the number 20 during his tenure at the club. Card was awarded the Carji Greeves Medal in 1983.

Card was captain coach of the Wangaratta Football Club in the Ovens and Murray Football League from 1988 to 1990, then was assistant playing coach with Milawa Football Club when they won the 1991 Ovens & King Football League premiership. Card then returned to Wangaratta FC from 1994 to 1996 as their non playing coach.

References

External links
 
 

Carji Greeves Medal winners
Geelong Football Club players
Morwell Football Club players
Australian rules footballers from Victoria (Australia)
Living people
1957 births